Tombs is a surname. Notable people with the surname include:

Francis Tombs, Baron Tombs (1924–2020), English industrialist and politician
Joseph Harcourt Tombs (1884–1966), English World War I Victoria Cross recipient
Tina Tombs (born 1962), Canadian golfer

See also
Combs (surname)